Scodionyx mysticus is a moth of the family Noctuidae first described by Achille Guenée in 1852. It is found in the Sahara and the Arabian Peninsula.

There is one generation per year. Adults are on wing from October to April.

The larvae feed on Acacia raddiana.

External links

Image

Catocalinae
Moths of the Middle East